The Cincinnati Skywalk was a series of walkways, primarily indoors and elevated, that allowed pedestrians to traverse downtown Cincinnati, Ohio.

Built in segments starting in 1971, the  skywalk was completed in 1997 at a total cost of more than $16 million. Since then, city leaders began to see the skywalk as a barrier to economic development, as it may decrease street-level and sidewalk pedestrian traffic. The skywalk was dismantled in stages from 2002 to 2020.

Creation

In 1957, Cincinnati Director of Planning Herbert W. Stevens introduced the idea of "elevated skywalks" as a way to keep pedestrians safe from cars driving through downtown. The concept developed further in the 1960s as part of an urban renewal effort, hoping to make downtown easier to navigate and enjoy at a time when indoor, climate-controlled suburban shopping malls were growing in popularity.

When the federal government agreed to provide urban renewal funds to help pay for the project, Cincinnati city's council decided to move forward with the skywalk. The first link opened in 1971, connecting the Cincinnati Convention Center to Fountain Square.

More segments were added through the 1970s, 1980s, and 1990s. It was officially finished in 1997 at a total cost of more than $16 million.

Changing attitudes

Cincinnati's "2002 Center City Plan" emphasized downtown economic development, and stated the Skywalk allowed pedestrians to bypass the street and led people to believe downtown was abandoned. The report stated that increasing street-level pedestrian traffic would increase economic activity downtown.

Safety and maintenance were also becoming a growing concern. As the skywalk was built, Cincinnati signed dozens of agreements with private property owners for upkeep, which made it confusing to determine who was responsible for making fixes and providing security.

In 2005, then-mayor Charlie Luken told the New York Times the Skywalk is "ugly" and the space underneath is "yucky".

Removing segments

In 2002, five years after it was considered complete, pieces of the skywalk started to come down. Crews tore out a segment connecting Riverfront Stadium to the Atrium I and II office buildings while configuring Fort Washington Way.

In 2005, as part of the redevelopment of Fountain Square, the city ripped out a segment from the Fifth Third Center to Vine Street and a pedestrian bridge over 5th Street.

In June 2008, a bridge segment over 5th Street between Elm and Race Streets was demolished. When the segment was first built, it connected Saks Fifth Avenue to an office tower on the north side of 5th Street. When the office tower was torn down, the skywalk bridge was no longer needed and removed.

In 2012, the city removed an open-air segment of the skywalk over Elm St. and Rusconi Place.

In January 2013, the bridge segment over Race Street between 5th and 6th Streets was removed. This bridge once connected Macy's to an office building on the west side of Race Street. The office building was demolished but the bridge remained intact for several years. The construction of the new dunnhumby USA office building did not include the use of the skywalk bridge and the bridge was demolished.

In October 2020, perhaps the most recognizable segment of skywalk over 5th Street was removed between Race and Vine Streets: the glass-enclosed skywalk connecting Carew Tower to Fountain Place, the former home of Macy's. 3CDC removed this segment of skywalk as part of its Fountain Place redevelopment efforts.

Map

The Cincinnati Enquirer published this map of the skywalk in 2003, showing the skywalk as a fully connected system that stretched and wound from W. 6th St. near Central Ave., east and south to the area of E. 4th St. near Sycamore.

References

Skyways
Transportation buildings and structures in Cincinnati
1971 establishments in Ohio
Pedways in the United States
Transportation buildings and structures in Ohio